International Organisations Act 1968 (c. 48) is an Act of Parliament of the United Kingdom which recognises the UK's duties to international organisations in which it is a member.

Contents

See also
UK constitutional law
International law

Notes

Constitutional laws of the United Kingdom